Dodo Services Pty Ltd, trading as Dodo, is an Australian Internet service provider, based in Melbourne, and a fully owned subsidiary of Vocus Communications (ASX: VOC).

History 
The company was established in September 2001. Dodo expanded services which include mobile broadband, VoIP, home and car insurance, gas and electricity.

In 2013, the company was acquired by M2 Group. Prior to being bought out, the company had over 400,000 customers and 660,000 active services. M2 paid $203.90 million for Dodo and $44.10 million for Eftel as some of the owners owned both companies.

References

External links 
 

M2 Group
Companies based in Melbourne
Internet service providers of Australia
Telecommunications companies of Australia
Telecommunications companies established in 2001